The 1987 Italian Open was a tennis tournament played on outdoor clay courts at the Foro Italico in Rome in Italy that was part of the 1987 Nabisco Grand Prix and of 1987 Virginia Slims World Championship Series. The men's tournament was held from 11 May through 17 May 1987 while the women's tournament was held from 4 May through 10 May 1987. Mats Wilander and Steffi Graf won the singles titles.

Finals

Men's singles

 Mats Wilander defeated  Martín Jaite 6–3, 6–4, 6–4

Women's singles

 Steffi Graf defeated  Gabriela Sabatini 7–5, 4–6, 6–0

Men's doubles

 Guy Forget /  Yannick Noah defeated  Miloslav Mečíř /  Tomáš Šmíd 6–2, 6–7, 6–3

Women's doubles

 Martina Navratilova /  Gabriela Sabatini defeated  Claudia Kohde-Kilsch /  Helena Suková 6–4, 6–1

References

External links
 Official website  
 Official website 
 ATP Tournament Profile
 WTA Tournament Profile

 
Italian Open
Italian Open
Italian Open (tennis)
Italian Open (Tennis), 1987
Italian Open

it:Internazionali d'Italia 1988